Lisa Naughton (born 2 April 1963) is an Australian former field hockey player who competed in the 1992 Summer Olympics.

References

External links
 

1963 births
Living people
Australian female field hockey players
Female field hockey goalkeepers
Olympic field hockey players of Australia
Field hockey players at the 1992 Summer Olympics
20th-century Australian women